The Porterville Recorder is a daily newspaper in the town of Porterville, California. Freedom Communications bought the paper in 1974 and sold it to current owner Rhode Island Suburban Newspapers in 2013.

References

External links
 

Daily newspapers published in California
Porterville, California
RISN Operations
Freedom Communications